Celtis is a genus of about 60–70 species of deciduous trees, commonly known as hackberries or nettle trees, widespread in warm temperate regions of the Northern Hemisphere. The genus is part of the extended hemp family (Cannabaceae).

Description
Diagnostically, Celtis can be very similar to trees in the Rosaceae and other rose motif families.

Small flowers of this monoecious plant appear in early spring while the leaves are still developing. Male flowers are longer and fuzzy. Female flowers are greenish and more rounded.

The fruit is a small drupe  in diameter, edible in many species, with a dryish but sweet, sugary consistency, reminiscent of a date.

Taxonomy
Previously included either in the elm family (Ulmaceae) or a separate family, Celtidaceae, the APG III system places Celtis in an expanded hemp family (Cannabaceae).

Phylogeny 
Members of the genus are present in the fossil record at early as the Miocene of Europe, and Paleocene of North America and eastern Asia.

Species
66 species are currently accepted.

Celtis adolfi-friderici  
Celtis africana  – white stinkwood 
Celtis australis  – European hackberry, European nettle tree, or lote tree 
Celtis balansae  
Celtis berteroana  
Celtis bifida  
Celtis biondii 
Celtis boninensis  
Celtis brasiliensis 
Celtis bungeana  – Bunge's hackberry
Celtis caucasica  – Caucasian hackberry
Celtis caudata  
Celtis cerasifera  
Celtis chekiangensis  
Celtis chichape  
Celtis conferta  – cottonwood
Celtis conferta subsp. conferta – New Caledonia
Celtis conferta subsp. amblyphylla – Lord Howe Island
Celtis ehrenbergiana  – spiny hackberry, granjeno (Spanish) 
Celtis eriocarpa 
Celtis glabrata  (syn. Celtis planchoniana ) 
Celtis gomphophylla  
Celtis harperi 
Celtis hildebrandii 
Celtis hypoleuca  
Celtis iguanaea  – iguana hackberry 
Celtis jamaicensis 
Celtis jessoensis  – Japanese hackberry 
Celtis julianae  – Julian hackberry 
Celtis koraiensis  – Korean hackberry 
Celtis labilis  – Hubei hackberry
Celtis laevigata  – southern or sugar hackberry , sugarberry 
Celtis latifolia 
Celtis lindheimeri  – Lindheimer's hackberry 
Celtis loxensis 
Celtis luzonica  
Celtis madagascariensis  
Celtis mauritiana  (syn. Celtis prantlii ) 
Celtis mildbraedii  
Celtis neglecta 
Celtis occidentalis  – common or northern hackberry, false elm 
Celtis orthocanthos 
Celtis pacifica 
Celtis pallida  – desert or shiny hackberry 
Celtis paniculata  – whitewood 
Celtis petenensis 
Celtis philippensis 
Celtis punctata 
Celtis reticulata  – netleaf hackberry 
Celtis rigescens 
Celtis rubrovenia 
Celtis salomonensis 
Celtis schippii 
Celtis serratissima 
Celtis sinensis  – Chinese or Japanese hackberry, Chinese nettle tree 
Celtis solenostigma 
Celtis spinosa 
Celtis strychnoides 
Celtis tala  – tala 
Celtis tenuifolia  – dwarf hackberry 
Celtis tessmannii  
Celtis tetrandra   – Nilgiri elm
Celtis tikalana  
Celtis timorensis  – kayu busok
Celtis toka  
Celtis tournefortii  – Oriental hackberry 
Celtis trinervia  – almex
Celtis vandervoetiana 
Celtis vitiensis 
Celtis zenkeri

Removed from genus 
Trema cannabina  (as C. amboinensis )
Trema lamarckiana  (as C. lamarckiana )
Trema orientalis  (as C. guineensis  or C. orientalis )
Trema tomentosa  (as C. aspera  or C. tomentosa )

Etymology 
The generic name originated in Latin and was applied by Pliny the Elder to the unrelated Ziziphus lotus.

Distribution and habitat
The trees are widespread in warm temperate regions of the Northern Hemisphere, including Southern Europe, South and East Asia, southern and central North America, south and central Africa, and northern and central South America.

Ecology
Some species, including common hackberry (C. occidentalis) and C. brasiliensis, are honey plants and a pollen source for honeybees of lesser importance.

Lepidoptera
Celtis species are used as food plants by the caterpillars of certain Lepidoptera. These include mainly brush-footed butterflies, most importantly the distinct genus Libythea (beak butterflies) and some Apaturinae (emperor butterflies):
 
Acytolepis puspa – common hedge blue, recorded on Chinese hackberry (C. sinensis)
Automeris io – Io moth, recorded on southern hackberry (C. laevigata)
Asterocampa celtis – hackberry butterfly or hackberry emperor
Libythea celtis – European beak
Libythea labdaca – African beak
Libythea lepita – common beak
Libythea myrrha – club beak, recorded on C. tetrandra
Libytheana carinenta – American snout or common snout butterfly
Nymphalis xanthomelas – scarce tortoiseshell, recorded on European hackberry (C. australis)
Sasakia charonda – great purple emperor, recorded on C. jessoensis and C. sinensis
A putative new taxon of the two-barred flasher (Astraptes fulgerator) cryptic species complex, provisionally called "CELT," has hitherto only been found on C. iguanaea.

Pathogens
The plant pathogenic basidiomycete fungus Perenniporia celtis was first described from a Celtis host plant. Some species of Celtis are threatened by habitat destruction.

Uses

Several species are grown as ornamental trees, valued for their drought tolerance. They are a regular feature of arboreta and botanical gardens, particularly in North America. Chinese hackberry (C. sinensis) is suited for bonsai culture; a magnificent specimen in Daegu-myeon is one of the natural monuments of South Korea. The berries are generally edible when they ripen and fall. C. occidentalis fruit was used by the Omaha, eaten casually, as well as the Dakota people, who pounded them fine, seeds and all. The Pawnee used the pounded fruits in combination with fat and parched corn.

Hackberry wood is sometimes used in cabinetry and woodworking. The berries of some, such as C. douglasii, are edible, and were consumed by the Mescalero Apaches.

Gallery

References

External links

 
Plants used in bonsai
Rosales genera